The Singapore Zoo, formerly known as the Singapore Zoological Gardens or Mandai Zoo, is a  zoo located on the margins of Upper Seletar Reservoir within Singapore's heavily forested central catchment area. Opened in 1973, the zoo was built at a cost of $9 million that was granted by the government of Singapore.

It is operated by the Mandai Wildlife Group, which also manages the neighbouring Night Safari, River Wonders, the Jurong Bird Park as well as the forthcoming Rainforest Wild Park. All five parks makes up the Mandai Wildlife Reserve, which consists of more than 15,000 animals from 1,000 species. Within the zoo, there are about 315 species of animals, of which some 16 percent are considered to be a threatened species. The zoo attracts over 2 million visitors every year.

Singapore Zoo has always exhibited animals in naturalistic, 'open' exhibits with hidden barriers, moats, and glass between the animals and visitors. It houses the largest captive colony of orangutans in the world. The Singapore Zoo has been highly ranked by various international metrics.

History

Prior to the establishment of Singapore Zoo, there were other short-lived zoos in Singapore's history, including the first recorded zoo founded in the early 1870s at the present-day Singapore Botanic Gardens, a zoo opened in the 1920s in Ponggol (present-day Punggol) by animal trader William Lawrence Soma Basapa and two zoos run by two brothers by the surname of Chan during the 1960s.

The conception of the Singapore Zoo dates from 1969. At the time, the Public Utilities Board (PUB) decided to use some of its land holdings around reservoirs for parks and open recreational facilities. The executive chairman of the PUB, Dr Ong Swee Law, set aside  of land for the construction of a zoological garden.

In 1970, consultants and staff were hired, and in 1971, the construction of the basic 50 enclosures was started. Animals were collected from dealers and donated by sponsors. The director of the National Zoological Gardens of Sri Lanka, Lyn de Alwis, was hired as a special consultant to work out the problems inherent in tropical zoos.

On 27 June 1973, the Singapore Zoo opened its gates for the first time with a collection of 270 animals from over 72 species, and a staff of 130. By 1990, 1,600 animals from more than 160 species lived in social groups, housed in 65 landscaped exhibits with boundaries conceived to look as natural as possible.

In 1987, the zoo began to display rare animals loaned by other zoos. The first animals displayed in this manner were the rare golden snub-nosed monkeys from China in 1987, which attracted more than half a million visitors. This was followed by white tigers from Cincinnati Zoo in 1988 and giant pandas from Wolong National Nature Reserve in 1990.

On 1 August 2000, Singapore Zoological Gardens, Jurong Bird Park and Night Safari were integrated under Wildlife Reserves Singapore, under the umbrella of Temasek Holdings. The zoo underwent a restructuring to improve its efficiency and branding which included the merging of shared services and expansion of consultancy services overseas. Night Safari, which began under the zoo, became a separate branding entity.

The restructuring of the zoo was not without controversy. Several key staff, including CEO Bernard Harrison, left as a result in 2002, citing differences in management style. In 2003, Wildlife Reserves Singapore launched a massive rebranding exercise, which was shelved due to widespread public disapproval. The name of the zoo was simplified to Singapore Zoo sometime by 2005.

As a result of the restructuring, more facilities were launched, such as a S$3.6 million Wildlife Healthcare & Research Centre in 2005. Existing infrastructure was revamped to further enhance the experience of visitors. The growth in revenue continued on an upward trend.

Exhibits

Treetops Trail
Crab-eating macaque
False gharial
Siamang

Forest Lodge
Alligator gar
Giant catfish
Tambaqui
West Indian manatee

Wild Africa
This area houses the zoo's African savannah animals.

African lion
African wild dog
Cheetah
Common ostrich
Grévy's zebra
Marabou stork
Meerkat
Nyala
Red river hog
Rothschild's giraffe
Southern white rhinoceros

Cat Country
Fossa
Naked mole-rat
Sri Lankan leopard

Reptile Garden
The outdoor portion of the zoo's reptile complex which has enclosures for the zoo's larger reptiles.

African spurred tortoise
Aldabra giant tortoise
Burmese roofed turtle
Gharial
Komodo dragon
Rhinoceros iguana
Saltwater crocodile
Siamese crocodile

RepTopia
Opening on August 16, 2017, RepTopia was a renovation of the 35 year old Snake House. Several species of reptiles and amphibians are housed in four different regions, Deserts of the World, Indo-Pacific, Tropical Africa and Neotropical Rainforests. A behind-the-scenes facility is visible to the guests, allowing them to view the hatchery.

In January 2022, thirteen Roti Island snake-necked turtles were successfully repatriated to a breeding facility in Kupang.

Bell's anglehead lizard
Blue-crowned parakeet
Brazilian teal
Channel-billed toucan
Cinnamon teal
Crocodile monitor
Dyeing poison dart frog
Electric blue gecko
Elongated tortoise
Gila monster
Golden-capped parakeet
Golden poison frog
Green iguana
Green tree python
Henkel's leaf-tailed gecko
Jandaya parakeet
King cobra
Madagascar day gecko
Northern caiman lizard
Panther chameleon
Plumed basilisk
Radiated tortoise
Red-footed tortoise
Reticulated python
Roti Island snake-necked turtle
Shingleback skink
Veiled chameleon
West African Gaboon viper
Western diamondback rattlesnake

Tortoise Shell-ter
Formerly the Critters Longhouse, which housed small mammals, the building was transformed into the Tortoise Shell-ter in 2016, housing different species of tortoises in seven enclosures, among other reptiles and birds. Each habitat is climate-controlled with special lighting, heating and humidity control.

Burmese star tortoise
Flat-backed spider tortoise
Golden coin turtle
Indian star tortoise
Indochinese box turtle
Leopard tortoise
Ploughshare tortoise

Fragile Forest
A 20,000 cubic metre biodome that houses a wide variety of tropical birds, mammals, reptiles, fish and invertebrates. The area also has a butterfly house consisting of 11 butterfly species, 8 of which are native to Singapore.

Australian wood duck
Axolotl
Barred tiger salamander
Black lory
Eclectus parrot
Finlayson's squirrel
Freckled duck
Golden lion tamarin
Great argus
Great eggfly butterfly
Green iguana
Island imperial pigeon
Large flying fox
Lesser mouse-deer
Linnaeus's two-toed sloth
Long-nosed horned frog
Malayan peacock-pheasant
Nicobar pigeon
Ocellate river stingray
Pied imperial pigeon
Pinon's imperial pigeon
Prevost's squirrel
Radjah shelduck
Red-crested turaco
Ring-tailed lemur
Spotted whistling duck
Toco toucan
Western crowned pigeon
White-faced saki
Wonga pigeon
Zebra dove

The Great Rift Valley of Ethiopia
Visitors first walk through a Konso and Amharic village with several waga sculptures dotted around. A large troop of hamadryas baboons are mixed with a herd of Nubian ibexes in an enclosure recreating the rugged steppes of Ethiopia.

Common kusimanse
Hamadryas baboon
Meerkat
Nubian ibex
Rock hyrax
Serval
South African ground squirrel

Australasia
This zone features a walkthrough habitat with kangaroos and wallabies along with a cassowary enclosure at the end of the zone. Tree-kangaroos are housed indoors but are able to access an outdoor enclosure. The zoo's male tree-kangaroo named Makaia was born in 2014 at the Adelaide Zoo and orphaned at five weeks old when his mother, Kia was crushed by a falling tree branch. He made headlines after he was adopted by a yellow-footed rock wallaby. Makaia arrived at the Singapore Zoo in 2016 to accompany the zoo's female tree-kangaroo, Nupela. On February 4, 2020, Nupela gave birth to a male joey.

Four female koalas named Paddle, Chan, Pellita and Idalia were on loan to the zoo from the Lone Pine Koala Sanctuary to celebrate Singapore's golden jubilee in April 2015 and returned to Australia in February 2016.

Eastern grey kangaroo
Emu
Goodfellow's tree-kangaroo
Green anaconda
Magpie goose
Pygmy hippopotamus
Red-necked wallaby
Southern cassowary

Primate Kingdom
The Primate Kingdom consists of a large moat with several islands which house monkeys and lemurs like s, s, colobus monkeys, s and some of the only douc langurs in captivity.  

Black-and-white ruffed lemur
Black-handed spider monkey
Black howler monkey
De Brazza's monkey
Common squirrel monkey
Cotton-top tamarin
Eastern black-and-white colobus
L'Hoest's monkey
Red-shanked douc
Ring-tailed lemur
White-faced saki

Elephants of Asia
A herd of five female Asian elephants live in a 2.47 acre (1 ha) habitat with a large pool. Komali, the matriarch of the herd, is a Sri Lankan elephant, Gambir and Jati are Indian elephants and half-sisters Aprila and Intan are Sumatran elephants.

Indian elephant
Sri Lankan elephant
Sumatran elephant

Rainforest KidzWorld
Located at the very north of the zoo, Rainforest KidzWorld is home to many domestic animals like goats and rabbits and there are other attractions in it like a carousel and a splash pad. Guests are allowed to closely interact with the animals and feed them.

Other animals
African penguin
Asian small-clawed otter
Azara's agouti
Bornean orangutan
Buff-cheeked gibbon
California sea lion
Celebes crested macaque
Chimpanzee
Emperor tamarin
Goeldi's monkey
Great white pelican
Lowland anoa
Malayan tiger
North Sulawesi babirusa
Pileated gibbon
Proboscis monkey
Pygmy marmoset
Red-capped mangabey
Red-footed tortoise
Red ruffed lemur
Sumatran orangutan
White tiger

Education and conservation
The Wildlife Healthcare & Research Centre was opened in March 2006 as part of the zoo's efforts in wildlife conservation. The centre further underscores Singapore Zoo and Night Safari's commitment to conservation research, providing the infrastructure for the parks and overseas zoological partners to better execute their research programmes. The Singapore Zoo is the first zoo in the world to breed a polar bear in the tropics. Inuka was born on 26 December 1990, died 25 April 2018 (aged 27).

Animal activist and conservationist known as Steve Irwin admired the Singapore Zoo greatly, adopting it as the 'sister zoo' to Australia Zoo. He was at the Singapore Zoo in 2006 to officiate the opening of the Australian Outback exhibit.

Presentations
"Breakfast in the Wild" allows visitors to meet and interact closely with animals in the zoo, which has previously included Ah Meng (died on 8 February 2008) who was an icon of the Singapore tourism industry. Animal presentations, as well as token feedings coupled with live commentaries by keepers, are also the daily staple in Singapore Zoo.

The "Rainforest Fights Back" presentation is housed in the Shaw Amphitheatre, the main amphitheater in the zoo. Actors and performers act alongside the animals: in-show, a villainous poacher attempts to mow down a section of tropical rainforest for land development, and is foiled by the native people and the animals of the rainforest — orangutans, lemurs, peacocks, otters and cockatiels.

The "Elephants at Work and Play" presentation demonstrates how elephants are used as beasts of burden in south-east Asian countries. The animal caretakers are referred to as mahouts, and the show simulates how a mahout would instruct an elephant to transport logs or kneel so that they can be mounted. As of 2018, the show has been reworked as part of a shift in the care for the elephants to feature their natural behaviour instead of performing stunts.

The "Splash Safari" presentation features the zoo's sea lions performing acts relating to their natural behaviors, and also playing frisbee with a lucky visitor.

The "Animal Friends" presentation, housed in the Rainforest KidzWorld Amphitheatre in the zoo's children's section, features mostly domesticated animals such as dogs and parrots performing tricks with the aim of teaching young children about pet responsibility.

Organising events
There are three events venues in the zoo: Forest Lodge, Pavilion-By-the-Lake and Garden Pavilion. There are also three cocktail venues: Elephants of Asia, Tiger Trek and Treetops Trail. The Singapore Zoo also caters for birthday parties and weddings.

Incidents
On 7 March 1973, a black panther escaped from the zoo before it had opened.

In early 1974, a hippopotamus named Congo escaped from the zoo and spent 47 days in the Seletar Reservoir.

Other escapes in 1974 included an eland and a tiger.

On 13 November 2008, two Bengal white tigers mauled a cleaner, 32-year old Nordin Montong to death after he jumped into a moat surrounding their enclosure and taunted the animals.

Awards

Awarded to Singapore Zoo:

 Travellers' Choice Awards - Top 3 Zoos in the World, 2018
Singapore Tourism Awards, 2017
Traveller's Choice Awards - Zoos and Aquariums, 2017, 2015 and 2014
Best Customer Service (Retail) Award, 2014
Meritorious Defence Partner Award, 2013
Singapore Experience Awards, 2013
Singapore Service Award, 2013
Singapore Service Excellence Medallion - Organisation, 2013
Meritorious Defence Partner Award, 2012
Most Popular Wildlife Park, Asian Attractions Awards, 2011
Michelin 3-star rating, 2008
 Best Breakfast, 40 Jewels in ASEAN's Crown, 2007
 One of the World's Best Zoos, forbes-travel.com, 2007
 Bronze, Singapore H.E.A.L.T.H Awards, 2004
 Leisure Attraction of the Year, 6th, 7th, 8th, 13th, 16th, 17th, 20th and 22nd Singapore Tourism Board Awards
 Best New Attraction for the hamadryas baboons exhibit, ASEAN Tourism Association, 2002
 Cleanest Toilet, Ministry of Environment, 1997 and 1998

Gallery

Transportation

Public transportation
Two public bus services, 138 and 927, call at the bus stop near to the Zoo. 138 connects with the nearest MRT station at Springleaf as well as Ang Mo Kio station, while 927 connects with Choa Chu Kang station.

Bus
A shuttle service, known as the Mandai Shuttle, plies daily between Khatib MRT station and the Zoo. A one-way trip cost $1 for everyone above the age of three. A separate service, known as the Mandai Express, operates on selected weekends and holidays to and from three locations in Bedok, Sengkang, and Tampines. A one-way trip cost between $1 and $3 for everyone above the age of three.

Notes

References

Bibliography

 Véronique Sanson (1992). Gardens and Parks of Singapore. Oxford University Press. 
 Ilsa Sharp (1994). The First 21 Years: The Singapore Zoological Gardens Story. Singapore Zoological Gardens.

External links

 
 Official website
 Map of Singapore Zoo
 Singapore Zoo on the Singapore Government National Library Board
 Singapore Zoo Guide

 
Zoos in Singapore
Tourist attractions in Singapore
1973 establishments in Singapore
Temasek Holdings
Zoos established in 1973
Singaporean brands